Aagt Germonts (1621-?), was a Dutch woman who was accused of witchcraft.

She was married to a farmer in De Weere in Abbekerk district.

She had three children born dead, and when the featuses where buried without anyone having seen them, she was suspected for witchcraft or for having murdered them. 
She was prosecuted for witchcraft. When the graves of her dead children were exhumed by the court, the bodies of her children were found out to be dolls. She was sentenced to death of sorcery, but the death sentenced were commuted to pillorying holding the three dolls.

The case against her attracted a lot of attention: witch trials were uncommon in the Netherlands, where no person had been executed for sorcery since Anna Muggen in 1608.

Her case were the subject of a treatise, Mis-geboorte of verhael van 't Abbekerker-wijf haare drie miskramen (1661). The contemporary jurists doubted her guilt and her case were taken as an example of the negativity of the belief in witchcraft.

References

1621 births
Witch trials in the Netherlands
17th-century Dutch women
People accused of witchcraft